FENE stands for the finitely extensible nonlinear elastic model of a long-chained polymer. It simplifies the chain of monomers by connecting  a sequence of beads with nonlinear springs. The spring force law is governed by inverse Langevin function or approximated by the Warner's relationship

 

Where  and H is the spring constant.

Total stretching force on ith bead can be written as: .

See also 
 FENE-P

References 

 Dynamics of dissolved polymer chains in isotropic turbulence

External links 
 QPolymer: an open source (for Mac OS X) FENE model Brownian dynamics simulation software

Polymers